Laxmi Kanta Mohapatra (born 10 June 1954) is an Indian Judge and former Chief Justice of the Manipur High Court.

Career
Mohapatra was born in 1954. He passed Law from M S Law College of Cuttack in 1977 and started practice on Civil, Criminal, Service and Labour matters in Orissa High Court. He served as the legal retainer for South Eastern Railway, Industrial Promotion & Investment Corporation of Odisha (IPICOL), Odisha State Financial Corporation (OSFC), Stock Exchange and other organizations in the High Court. On 16 September 1999, he was appointed Judge of Orissa High Court. Justice Mohapatra was transferred to Allahabad High Court on 17 October 2012 as an additional judge. He also took charge of the Acting Chief Justice of Allahabad High Court from 19 September to 20 October 2013. Mohapatra was elevated in the post of the Chief Justice of Manipur High Court on 10 July 2014.

References

1954 births
Living people
Indian judges
Judges of the Orissa High Court
Judges of the Allahabad High Court
Chief Justices of Manipur High Court
21st-century Indian lawyers
21st-century Indian judges